Jailolo is a volcanic complex on a peninsula (Jailolo Bay), west of Halmahera island. It has lava flows on the eastern flank, small caldera at the west and south-west of the mountain, hot springs along the north-west coast of the caldera. Small volcanic island was formed by the Kailupa cone, off the southern coast of the peninsula.

See also 

 List of volcanoes in Indonesia

References 

Volcanoes of Halmahera
Complex volcanoes
Emperor of China